Kathrin Boron (born 4 November 1969 in Eisenhüttenstadt, East Germany) is a German sculler, and four-time Olympic gold medallist. She's an athlete of the SV Dynamo / SG Dynamo Potsdam.

Boron won the women's double sculls at the 1992 Summer Olympics with Kerstin Köppen and 2000 Summer Olympics with Jana Thieme, and the women's quad sculls at the 1996 Summer Olympics and 2004 Summer Olympics. At the 2008 Summer Olympics, she finished third in the quad sculls. In addition, Boron has won seven World Championship Gold Medals and five Silver, starting with gold in the double sculls at Tasmania in 1990.

Boron was honoured for her outstanding career in rowing with the 2009 Thomas Keller Medal.

References

External links
 

1969 births
Living people
Sportspeople from Eisenhüttenstadt
People from Bezirk Frankfurt
German female rowers
Olympic rowers of Germany
Rowers at the 1992 Summer Olympics
Rowers at the 1996 Summer Olympics
Rowers at the 2000 Summer Olympics
Rowers at the 2004 Summer Olympics
Rowers at the 2008 Summer Olympics
Olympic gold medalists for Germany
Olympic bronze medalists for Germany
Olympic medalists in rowing
Medalists at the 2008 Summer Olympics
Medalists at the 2004 Summer Olympics
Medalists at the 2000 Summer Olympics
Medalists at the 1996 Summer Olympics
Medalists at the 1992 Summer Olympics
World Rowing Championships medalists for East Germany
World Rowing Championships medalists for Germany
Thomas Keller Medal recipients
Recipients of the Silver Laurel Leaf
20th-century German women